Bad Girls Club: East Meets West is the seventeenth and final season of the Bad Girls Club. On January 10, 2017, the cast was revealed, along with a premiere date of February 14, 2017. Before the season officially began, a casting special aired on February 7, 2017. This season consists of Bad Girls from only the East Coast and the West Coast, living in a spacious Downtown Los Angeles loft. It was the final Bad Girls Club series to air on Oxygen before its format change to a true crime network; Oxygen has yet to announce the show's future fate in another venue.

Cast

Original Bad Girls
The season began with seven original bad girls, of which three were removed by production. One replacement bad girl was introduced in one of their absences later in the season.

Replacement Bad Girl

Duration of cast

Episodes

Notes

References

External links
 

2017 American television seasons
Bad Girls Club seasons
Television shows set in Los Angeles